Lyndel Rashad Richardson (born 7 May 1986) is an Anguillan cricketer and current member of the Leeward Islands cricket team.

Playing career
He made his debut for Anguilla at the 2006 Stanford 20/20 Tournament in Antigua and made his first appearance for the Leeward Islands in a Regional Super50 game against the CCC on March 11, 2013. He made his Leeward Islands first class debut later that same month against Jamaica. Richardson currently plays as an opening batsman for the first class Leeward Islands team.

References

Leeward Islands cricketers
Living people
1986 births
Anguillan cricketers